Serhiy Ichanskyi (born 1 September 1995) is a Ukrainian professional footballer who plays as a midfielder for Dinaz Vyshhorod.

Career
Ichanskyi spent his career in the Ukrainian Premier League Reserves with FC Vorskla Poltava. In summer 2015, he was promoted to the  senior squad in the Ukrainian Premier League. He made his senior debut against FC Volyn Lutsk on 10 December 2016.

References

External links 
 Profile on FFU site 
 

1995 births
Living people
Ukrainian footballers
Association football midfielders
Ukrainian Premier League players
FC Vorskla Poltava players
FC Cherkashchyna players
FC Helios Kharkiv players
FC Dinaz Vyshhorod players